Jean-Henri Dupin (1 September 1791 – 5 April 1887) was a French librettist and dramatist. He authored more than 200 pieces, of which fifty were written in collaboration with Eugène Scribe.

Works 
 Les Deux Hommes du Nord
 Le Fils d'un agent de change
 Le Fou de Péronne
 La Mansarde des artistes
 Les Manteaux
 Michel et Christine
 Napoléon à Berlin
 La Pension bourgeoise
 Les Six pantoufles, ou Le Rendez-vous des Cendrillons
 Le Solliciteur, ou L'Art d'obtenir des places
 La Villageoise somnambule, ou Les Deux fiancés

References 

French opera librettists
19th-century French dramatists and playwrights
Writers from Paris
1791 births
1887 deaths